The Bradley Octagon House, also called the Parker Octagon House or the James Parker Octagon House, is an historic octagon house located at 5783 Summer Street in Niagara Falls, Ontario, Canada.

It was built in 1906 by James Bradley, a carpenter, and it remained in his family until sold by his granddaughter Joyce Bradley in 1989. It is two storey with an octagonal cupola centered on its roof and a one-storey porch on the street side. Its original wooden siding was covered first by insulbrick and then by the present vinyl siding. It is listed as a heritage property by the city of Niagara Falls although it has not been officially designated as such.

See also

List of octagon houses

References

Octagon houses in Canada
Buildings and structures in Niagara Falls, Ontario
Heritage sites in Ontario
Houses completed in 1906
1906 establishments in Ontario